Liezel Huber and Lisa Raymond were the defending champions, but Raymond decided not to participate.
Huber played alongside Andrea Hlaváčková and lost in the final to Sara Errani and Roberta Vinci, 1–6, 1–6.

Seeds

Draw

References 
 Main Draw

Open GDF Suez - Doubles
Doubles 2013